Science Central is an interactive science center in Fort Wayne, Indiana.

Location
It was assigned for its founding the old building, which was built and expanded in 1929, located on North Clinton Street, and which was previously used by City Light and Power Plant, and which stood idle for some time. Science Central opened in the year 1995.

References

External links

 

Buildings and structures in Fort Wayne, Indiana
Culture of Fort Wayne, Indiana
Education in Allen County, Indiana
Tourist attractions in Fort Wayne, Indiana
Science education in the United States
Science museums in Indiana
1995 establishments in Indiana
Museums established in 1995